"The Door is Always Open" is a country song written by Dickey Lee and Bob McDill. First recorded by Tennessee Pulleybone for JMI Records, it went to number 75 on the Hot Country Songs chart in 1973.  A version by Lois Johnson, also in 1975, went to number 70 on the country music chart.

It was the Dave & Sugar version, released in 1976, that was released to radio and became known to audiences. That July, the song was the group's first number one hit on the Billboard Hot Country Singles chart.

Chart performance

Tennessee Pulleybone

Lois Johnson

Dave & Sugar

Other versions
Waylon Jennings later cut it as an album track for his 1975 album Dreaming My Dreams.
Dolly Parton performed the song in a November 1976 episode of her variety show Dolly!.
A Dutch translation "De deur staat altijd open" by duo Frank & Mirella was a minor Dutch hit during the summer of 1976.
Jamey Johnson covered his own version of the song on his 2008 album That Lonesome Song.

References
 

1975 singles
1976 singles
Waylon Jennings songs
Dave & Sugar songs
Jamey Johnson songs
Songs written by Dickey Lee
Songs written by Bob McDill
RCA Records singles
1975 songs